MassKara Festival Queen 2011 was the 31st edition of the MassKara Festival Queen  pageant held on October 17, 2011 at the University of St. La Salle Gymnasium in Bacolod City, Philippines. Alexis Danica Drilon, a 4th year BS Biology of University of St. La Salle was crowned by Bacolod City Mayor Evelio "Bing" Leonardia at the end of the event.

Final Results

Special awards

Contestants

Judges
 Odette Velarde - Samsung
 Rene Hinojales - Choreographer
 Dr. Kristine Varona-Yap - Masskara Festival Queen 1998
 Ramon Cua Locsin - Former Iloilo City Councilor
 Ryan Gamboa - ABS-CBN Bacolod news anchor
 Jewel Mae Lobaton-Pimentel - Masskara Festival Queen 1993, Binibining Pilipinas-Universe 1998

See also
 MassKara Festival

References

Beauty pageants in the Philippines